The Women's Asia Cup in Pakistan in 2005–06 is the Asian Cricket Council Women's One Day International cricket tournament. The three teams which took part in the tournament were India, Pakistan and Sri Lanka. It was held between 28 December 2005 and 4 January 2006, in Pakistan. The matches were played at the National Stadium, Karachi and Karachi Gymkhana Ground. India won the final against Sri Lanka by 97 runs.

Squads

Match summary

 Sri Lanka Women won the toss and elected to bat.
 Armaan Khan, Asmavia Iqbal, Qanita Jalil, Sabahat Rasheed, Sana Javed, Sana Mir and Tasqeen Qadeer (Pak) made their ODI debuts.

 

 Sri Lanka Women won the toss and elected to bat.

 India Women won the toss and elected to bat.
 Shumaila Mushtaq (Pak) made her ODI debut.

 Sri Lanka Women won the toss and elected to bat.

 Sri Lanka Women won the toss and elected to bat.

 Pakistan Women won the toss and elected to bat.
 Devika Palshikar (Ind) Humera Masroor (Pak) made their ODI debuts.

Final

 India Women won the toss and elected to bat.

References

External links
 Cricinfo tournament page

2005
2005 in women's cricket
2006 in women's cricket
2005 in Indian cricket
2005 in Pakistani cricket
2005 in Sri Lankan cricket
2006 in Indian cricket
2006 in Pakistani cricket
2006 in Sri Lankan cricket
International cricket competitions in 2005–06
International women's cricket competitions in Pakistan
December 2005 sports events in Asia
January 2006 sports events in Asia
2005 in Pakistani women's sport